Fernando Arretxe Caminondo, also known as Arretxe I (born in Valcarlos, Navarre, Spain on August 19, 1961) is an ex-player of Basque pelota.  He played as back-player.

He started his professional career as a pelotari in 1981, at Pamplona.  He has won several trophies and has been in several pelota companies such as Eskulari, Reur, Asegarce and Frontis, where he is now.

He has a son, Iker Arretxe (Arretxe II), who debuted in 2005.

Manomanista de Primera

Mano Parejas

Cuatro y Medio

References 

Spanish pelotaris
1961 births
Living people
Pelotaris from Navarre
People from Aoiz (comarca)